Qwara may refer to:
Qwara Province in Ethiopia
Qwara language
Qwara (woreda), a district in the approximate location as the province